ACSS may refer to:

 Academy of Social Sciences, the UK's national academy of academics, learned societies and practitioners in the social sciences
 Afro Celt Sound System, a musical group which fuses modern dance rhythms with traditional Irish (Celtic) and West African music
 Aluminium-conductor steel supported electrical cable
 Antichrist Superstar, the second full-length studio album by Marilyn Manson
 Aural Cascading Style Sheets, part of Cascading Style Sheets that makes a website more accessible to visually impaired and screen readers